The Maroto column was a militia column that operated at the beginning of the Spanish Civil War.

History 
The column was founded in Alicante, in the summer of 1936, by the Granadin anarchist leader Francisco Maroto del Ojo. At first it was made up of 270 anarchist militiamen. After being formed, on August 6 the column left Alicante and headed for the Granada front; they managed to reach the town of Guadix, where they established their headquarters. In this area they managed to recruit more volunteers, until the column reached a thousand troops.

Their military actions, however, were null. The Maroto column took part in the attack against the nationalist position at Güéjar Sierra, but it was never in a position to retake the city of Granada. At the end of 1936, the attempts to militarize this militia met with the opposition of their commander, Maroto del Ojo.

After its militarization the unit disappeared and its troops integrated into the 89th and 147th mixed brigades, on the Andalusian front.

References

Bibliography 
 
 
 
 

Defunct anarchist militant groups
Military units and formations of the Spanish Civil War
Confederal militias
Military units and formations established in 1936
Military units and formations disestablished in 1937